Steve Hoefer is an American television director and former stage manager.

Career
Hoefer began his career in the entertainment industry as tour guide at Universal Studios Hollywood after graduating from the University of Southern California majoring in theater while also studying Film/Television, Communications and History. Through a number of contacts he became a production assistant on The Fresh Prince of Bel-Air than serving as a stage manager on Out All Night. He then became a part of the Boy Meets World crew, where he made his directorial debut during that show's final season in 2000. 

In 2001, he stage managed for five episodes for the sitcom So Little Time starring Mary-Kate and Ashley Olsen. Hoefer continues to work with Schneider and directing episodes for a number of Schneider's series namely Drake & Josh, Zoey 101, iCarly, Victorious, Sam & Cat, Henry Danger and Game Shakers. Other than directing series for Dan Schneider, he has also directed episodes of the Disney Channel series A.N.T. Farm and Jessie, in 2012 and 2014 respectively.

Hoefer is a member of the Directors Guild of America.

Personal life
Hoefer is married and has two sons.

References

External links

American television directors
Living people
People from California
USC School of Dramatic Arts alumni
Year of birth missing (living people)